Dario Maltese (born 29 September 1992) is an Italian footballer who plays as a midfielder for Serie D club Lamezia Terme.

Club career

Palermo
Born in Palermo, Sicily Island, Maltese started his career at Fincantieri Palermo. In summer 2008 he joined U.S. Città di Palermo, a Serie A club from the same city.

Viareggio
On 1 July 2011 Maltese signed a 2-year professional contract with Palermo. He spent two seasons with Viareggio in a co-ownership deal, for a fee of peppercorn (€500). On 20 June 2013 Palermo bought back Maltese for €45,000.

Latina
On 9 July 2013 Maltese was signed by Serie B club Latina from Palermo in another co-ownership deal, along with Gianluca Di Chiara (loan). In January 2014 he left for L'Aquila in a temporary deal.

In June 2014 Palermo gave up the remain 50% registration rights of Maltese to Latina.

Reggiana
On 19 August 2014 Maltese was signed by Lega Pro club Reggiana in a temporary deal, with an option to purchase. On 12 August 2015 Maltese was signed in a 3-year contract.

Giana Erminio
On 9 October 2019 he joined Serie C club Giana Erminio until the end of the season. On 1 October 2020 he returned to the club for the 2020–21 season.

Audace Cerignola
On 28 July 2021 he signed for Serie D club Audace Cerignola.

Lamezia Terme
On 12 July 2022 he signed for Serie D club Lamezia Terme.

References

External links
 AIC profile (data by football.it) 
 

1992 births
Living people
Footballers from Palermo
Italian footballers
Association football midfielders
Serie B players
Serie C players
Serie D players
Palermo F.C. players
F.C. Esperia Viareggio players
Latina Calcio 1932 players
L'Aquila Calcio 1927 players
A.C. Reggiana 1919 players
Pisa S.C. players
U.S. Alessandria Calcio 1912 players
A.S. Giana Erminio players
S.S.D. Audace Cerignola players
F.C. Lamezia Terme players